Kerry Wynn (born February 1, 1991) is a former American football defensive end. Wynn attended  Louisa County High School in Mineral, VA where he graduated in 2009. He played for coach Mark Fischer while at Louisa County High School. He went on to play college football at the University of Richmond and was signed by the New York Giants as an undrafted free agent in 2014.

College career
In 2009, Wynn was redshirted in college where he led his team with 14 tackles and sacks. In 2010 due to an injury he only played three games. Wynn came back the next two years starting nearly every game in 2011 and leading the team again with 4 sacks and 7 tackles for a loss, and starting every game in 2012 leading the team with 4.5 sacks and 8 tackles for a loss. In 2013, Wynn became a third-team All-CAA selection after he started 10 games and recorded a career-high 11 tackles against North Carolina State University.

Professional career

New York Giants
Wynn signed with the New York Giants as an undrafted free agent on May 13, 2014.

Set to be a restricted free agent, Wynn signed his contract tender on April 18, 2017, to remain with the Giants.

On March 19, 2018, Wynn re-signed with the Giants.

Cincinnati Bengals
On March 22, 2019, Wynn signed a contract with the Cincinnati Bengals. He was placed on injured reserve on October 14, 2019, with a concussion.

References

External links
 Richmond Spiders bio
 
 New York Giants bio

1991 births
Living people
Players of American football from Virginia
People from Louisa, Virginia
American football defensive tackles
Richmond Spiders football players
New York Giants players
Cincinnati Bengals players